Artesonado or Spanish ceiling is a term for "a type of intricately joined wooden ceiling in which supplementary laths are interlaced into the rafters supporting the roof to form decorative geometric patterns", found in Spanish architecture. It is an example of Mudéjar style.

Artesonado decoration is usually in regular recesses between the rafter beams and the woodwork is gilded or painted. It originated in the Islamic regions of North Africa  and Al-Andalus, as can be seen at the Nasrid palace of the Alhambra, and was introduced into the Iberian Christian kingdoms by Muslim craftsmen  during the Christian reconquest of the Iberian Peninsula. The name comes from the Spanish word artesa, a shallow basin  used in bread making.

Beginning in the 13th century, artesonado  ceilings continued to be built through the Spanish Renaissance in the 15th and 16th centuries, with a change of the motifs to a classical Greco-Roman style.

Notable examples of artesonado ceilings include those in the throne room of the Aljafería (Zaragoza),  the Chapterhouse of Toledo Cathedral, and the Royal Convent of Santa Clara (Tordesillas).

Original artesonado ceilings, although expensive to transport and difficult to reassemble, were bought by private collectors during the 20th century and can be currently found, for example, in the Hearst Castle, Metropolitan Museum of New York, Fine Arts Museum of San Francisco, Tomas Aquinas College of Ventura County, Worcester Art Museum and Instituto Helenístico de Ciudad de MéxicoMéxico.

References

Literature
Maldonado, Basilio Pavón, "Artesonado", Grove Art Online, subscription required, accessed March 2019

External links

Architecture in Spain
Ceilings
Mudéjar architecture